7846 Setvák, provisional designation , is a stony Flora asteroid from the inner regions of the asteroid belt, approximately 3 kilometers in diameter. It was discovered on 16 January 1996, by Czech astronomer Miloš Tichý at Kleť Observatory in South Bohemia. The asteroid was named for Czech couple Stáňa and Martin Setvák.

Orbit and classification 

Setvák is a member of the Flora family, one of the largest groups of stony asteroids in the main-belt. It orbits the Sun in the inner main-belt at a distance of 1.9–2.8 AU once every 3 years and 7 months (1,315 days). Its orbit has an eccentricity of 0.18 and an inclination of 3° with respect to the ecliptic. Its observation arc dates back to 1979, due to precoveries obtained at the U.S. Palomar Observatory and the Siding Spring Observatory in Australia.

Physical characteristics

Diameter and albedo 

According to the survey carried out by the NEOWISE mission of NASA's Wide-field Infrared Survey Explorer, the asteroid measures 3.0 kilometers in diameter and its surface has a high albedo of 0.35, while the Collaborative Asteroid Lightcurve Link assumes an albedo of 0.24 (in accordance with the family's largest member and namesake, 8 Flora) and calculates a diameter of 2.7 kilometers. A large-scale survey by Pan-STARRS (PS1) assigns an LS-type, presumably an intermediary spectral type between the common stony S-types and the rather rare and reddish L-type asteroids.

Rotation period 

Two rotational lightcurves were obtained from photometric observations taken in the R-band at the U.S. Palomar Transient Factory in January 2014. The lightcurves gave a rotation period of 2.613 and 2.610 hours with a brightness amplitude of 0.11 and 0.14 in magnitude, respectively.

Naming 

This minor planet was named for Czech meteorologist Martin Setvák (born 1958), amateur astrophotographer and head of the Satellite Department of the Czech Hydrometeorological Institute, to honor his 40th birthday, as well as for his wife Stáňa Setváková (born 1967), a staff member of the Prague Planetarium. The official naming citation was published by the Minor Planet Center on 11 February 1998.

References

External links 
 Asteroid Lightcurve Database (LCDB), query form (info )
 Dictionary of Minor Planet Names, Google books
 Asteroids and comets rotation curves, CdR – Observatoire de Genève, Raoul Behrend
 Discovery Circumstances: Numbered Minor Planets (5001)-(10000) – Minor Planet Center
 
 

 

007846
Discoveries by Miloš Tichý
Named minor planets
19960116